James Nallen (born 1973 in Castlebar) is a former Gaelic footballer who played for the Mayo county team. He is the team's record appearance holder with 132.

He played in five All-Ireland finals, including an All-Ireland final replay against Meath in 1996, and won two All Stars, in 1996 and 2004.  He won a National Football League medal in 2001. However, he never won an All-Ireland medal. He retired from inter-county football in 2010.

At club level Nallen had much success with Crossmolina, winning Mayo Senior Football Championships in 1995, 1999, 2000, 2002, 2005 and 2006, as well as Connacht Senior Club Football Championships in 1999, 2000, 2002 and an All-Ireland Senior Club Football Championship in 2001.

He has also been a selector for Mayo.

He is Chief Technical Officer at NUI Galway's School of Physics NUI Galway.

References

1973 births
Living people
Claregalway Gaelic footballers
Crossmolina Gaelic footballers
Gaelic football backs
Gaelic football selectors
Mayo inter-county Gaelic footballers
People associated with the University of Galway
People from Castlebar